The Salyut Stadium is a multi-purpose stadium in Belgorod, Russia. It is currently used mostly for football matches and is the home ground of FC Salyut Belgorod. The stadium holds 11,456 people.
It is located in the center of Belgorod near the bus stop "Stadion". Renovated in 1999. Designed for football.

References

External links
Energomash Stadium

Football venues in Russia
Sport in Belgorod
Multi-purpose stadiums in Russia
Buildings and structures in Belgorod Oblast